Anthony Latina (born December 13, 1973) has been the men's basketball head coach at Sacred Heart University since 2013.

Sacred Heart
Latina is just the third head coach in Sacred Heart University men's basketball program history, succeeding Dave Bike who retired after 35 seasons at the helm. Latina was Bike's assistant coach for 8 seasons.

Head coaching record

References

1973 births
Living people
American men's basketball coaches
American men's basketball players
Brandeis University alumni
Central Connecticut Blue Devils men's basketball coaches
College men's basketball head coaches in the United States
College men's basketball players in the United States
Sacred Heart Pioneers men's basketball coaches
UMass Lowell River Hawks men's basketball coaches
Point guards